Pomaderris argyrophylla, commonly known as silver pomaderris, is a species of flowering plant in the family Rhamnaceae and is endemic to north-eastern Australia. It is a shrub or small tree with lance-shaped leaves and white to cream-coloured or yellow flowers.

Description
The lower surface of the leaves is covered with felt-like white hairs.

Taxonomy
Pomaderris argyrophylla was first formally described in 1951 by Norman Arthur Wakefield in The Victorian Naturalist from specimens collected by Cyril Tenison White on the Blackall Range near  Cooloolabin in 1943. The specific epithet (argyrophylla) means "silvery-leaved".

Distribution and habitat

References

argyrophylla
Flora of New South Wales
Flora of Queensland
Taxa named by Norman Arthur Wakefield
Plants described in 1951